Episodes is a compilation album by English multi-instrumentalist Mike Oldfield released in France in 1981 by Virgin.

Track listing 
 "Ommadawn" (Extract) - 7:01
 "Tubular Bells" (Extract) - 8:34
 "Incantations" (Extract 1) - 5:40
 "Incantations" (Extract 2) - 4:41
 "Hergest Ridge" (Extract) - 4:09
 "Platinum: Airborne" - 4:57
 "Punkadiddle" - 4:57
 "Sheba" - 3:33
 "Arrival" - 2:47
 "Celt" - 3:03
 "Portsmouth" - 2:03

References 

Mike Oldfield compilation albums
1981 compilation albums
Virgin Records compilation albums